Haladar (also Romanized as Haledar and A‘alādar; also known as Aladā) is a village in Abgarm Rural District, Abgarm District, Avaj County, Qazvin Province, Iran. At the 2006 census, its population was 84, in 26 families.

References 

Populated places in Avaj County